Raphitoma costellata is an extinct species of sea snail, a marine gastropod mollusc in the family Raphitomidae.

Subspecies
 † Raphitoma costellata bicristata A.E.M. Cossmann & G. Pissarro, 1913
 † Raphitoma costellata capellinii G.P. Deshayes, 1865 (synonym: Pleurotoma capellinii Deshayes, 1865; Raphitoma cappellinii (Deshayes, 1865))
 † Raphitoma costellata coptochetoides (Lamarck, 1804a)
 † Raphitoma costellata pachycolpa Cossmann, 1889

Description

Distribution
Fossils of this extinct marine species were found in Eocene strata in France.

References

 Cossmann (M.) & Pissarro (G.), 1913 Iconographie complète des coquilles fossiles de l'Éocène des environs de Paris, t. 2, p. pl. 46-65 
 Le Renard (J.) & Pacaud (J.-M.), 1995 Révision des Mollusques paléogènes du Bassin de Paris. 2 - Liste des références primaires des espèces. Cossmanniana, t. 3, vol. 3, p. 65-132

External links
 

costellata
Gastropods described in 1804